This list of gurdwaras in the United Kingdom shows the location of major gurdwaras (Sikh places of worship) in the United Kingdom.

England

West Yorkshire

South Yorkshire

East of England

South East England

South West England

Greater London

West Midlands

Wales

Scotland

See also
List of gurdwaras worldwide

References

External links
A detailed (possibly incomplete) list of Gurdwara and Sikh organisations in the UK

 
Indian diaspora in the United Kingdom
Sikhism-related lists
United Kingdom
Gurdwaras